The 2011 Malaysian Grand Prix (formally the 2011 Formula 1 Petronas Malaysia Grand Prix) was a Formula One motor race held on 10 April 2011 at the Sepang International Circuit in Selangor, Malaysia. It was the second round of the 2011 Formula One season. The 56-lap race was won by Red Bull Racing driver Sebastian Vettel after starting from pole position. Jenson Button finished second in a McLaren, and Nick Heidfeld completed the podium for Renault, in third place. It was his last podium.

As a consequence of the race, Vettel extended his lead in the World Drivers' Championship to 24 points over Button. Button's McLaren teammate Lewis Hamilton, who finished eighth in Malaysia, fell 4 points behind Button in third, tied on points with Mark Webber who finished fourth in the race. In the World Constructors' Championship, Red Bull's 37-point haul from the weekend allowed them to extend the championship lead over McLaren to 24 points, with Ferrari a further 12 points behind in third position.

This was Renault's last podium until the 2020 Eifel Grand Prix.

Report

Background 

After failing to qualify in Melbourne when they were forced to use the front wing from their 2010 car, Hispania Racing arrived at the circuit confident of being able to qualify for the race because their 2011 specification front wing satisfactorily completed its mandatory crash tests.

Several teams made driver changes for the first practice session. Nico Hülkenberg once again substituted for Paul di Resta at Force India, whilst Daniel Ricciardo drove in the place of Sébastien Buemi at Scuderia Toro Rosso, having previously driven in the place of Jaime Alguersuari in Melbourne. GP2 driver Davide Valsecchi also took part, replacing Heikki Kovalainen at Lotus.

Tyre supplier Pirelli brought its silver-banded hard compound tyre as the harder "prime" tyre and the yellow-banded soft compound as the softer "option" compound. This was the same tyre selection that Bridgestone had chosen to bring to the Malaysian Grand Prix for the past two years.

The high temperatures in Malaysia and the abrasive surface of the Sepang circuit led to tyre supplier Pirelli making predictions of high wear rates throughout qualifying and the race to the extent that pit stop strategy would be the deciding factor in the outcome.

Shortly after qualifying, the FIA moved the pole position slot from the left- to the right-hand side of the circuit. The pole slot had traditionally been on the left-hand side of the circuit because it offered the optimal racing line into the tight first corner, but was moved because of the build-up of marbles from the Pirelli tyres off the racing line, which runs over the right-hand side of the circuit.

Before the race, winner of race one in Melbourne - Sebastian Vettel - led the Drivers' Championship with the 25 points he gained for winning the only race thus far in 2011. The rest of the standings were as the drivers had finished at that race - Lewis Hamilton on 18, Vitaly Petrov on 15 etc.

In the Constructors' Championship, Red Bull Racing lead with 35 points, McLaren were second with 26 (9 points behind), and Ferrari were a further 8 behind McLaren on 18 points. Renault were in fourth, just behind on 15 points. Toro Rosso on 4, and Force India on 3, completed the points scoring teams.

Free practice 

The first practice session was run in humid but dry conditions, despite forecasts of heavy rain. Mark Webber was the fastest driver in the first session, over a second and a half faster than Lewis Hamilton and two seconds faster than Michael Schumacher. In the second Red Bull Racing car, Sebastian Vettel finished seventeenth overall, four seconds off Webber's pace; however, with comments from team principal Christian Horner in the build-up to the event suggesting that the unraced KERS device would be essential, Vettel's program was focused on developing the KERS unit rather than outright pace. Overall lap times were considerably slower at the circuit than in 2010, with Webber's fastest time over two and a half seconds slower than Lewis Hamilton's time in the same session a year previously.

The session was scattered with incidents; Virgin driver Jérôme d'Ambrosio suffered a mechanical fault that caused his right-front suspension to fail. The team were unable to repair the problem in time for the second practice session. Further down the pit lane, Renault experienced two similar problems, first with Nick Heidfeld, whose front-right tyre locked in place, and he was able to limp back to the garage. Vitaly Petrov was sidelined with a mechanical failure for most of the first session, and spun off at turn 9 when he experienced a similar problem to Heidfeld. Both Renaults spent most of the second session in the pits while the team investigated the problems, which was discovered to have come from a material fault in the suspension uprights, but they were limited to just a handful of laps overall.

Webber once again topped the second practice session, but his margin to Jenson Button was just five thousandths of a second. Pastor Maldonado set the fastest time early in the session, but damaged his Williams when he spun into a wall in the pit lane entry and slipped down the order. Vitantonio Liuzzi also encountered trouble, stopping on the circuit after bouncing over a kerb, but he was able to get his car going once more. The Hispania's new front wing worked as expected, with Liuzzi able to set times within 107% of the leader's benchmark in both practice sessions.

Hamilton came first in the final practice session, ahead of Webber and Button. The session was free of incidents, aside from several spins by Paul di Resta, while Liuzzi was held up in the pits for most of the session with a mechanical fault and only took to the circuit in the last fifteen minutes.

Qualifying 

The qualifying session was closely fought among the Red Bull and McLaren drivers, with the difference between pole and second place just one tenth of a second, as opposed to the eight tenths seen in Melbourne.

The first session was interrupted when Sébastien Buemi's Toro Rosso shed part of its sidepod while Buemi was on a flying lap. There was no internal damage to the car, and Buemi was able to return to the pits with the internal workings of the car showing. The session was red-flagged for several minutes while marshalls retrieved the bodywork. Buemi's car was inspected by the FIA and cleared to return to the circuit, though the exact cause of the problem remained unknown. Because of the incident involving Buemi, several teams were forced to abort flying laps, including the Ferraris of Felipe Massa and Fernando Alonso, who had been in the process of setting flying laps on the hard compound tyres. When the session restarted, the team were forced to sacrifice one set of soft tyres for both cars. By the end of the session, both Lotuses were eliminated, a clear two seconds faster than the Virgins of Glock and d'Ambrosio. Both Hispanias were also eliminated, but comfortably made the grid as Narain Karthikeyan in twenty-fourth position was a second inside the 107% margin. Pastor Maldonado was also eliminated, qualifying in eighteenth place.

The second qualifying period saw Jenson Button top the timing sheets, the first person to set a lap time under 1:36.000 all weekend. Several teams, most notably Renault elected to do just one run late in the session, with both Petrov and Heidfeld easily advancing to the third and final session. A late lap from Kamui Kobayashi saw him qualify for the final session at the expense of Michael Schumacher, who was demoted to eleventh place for the second race in a row. Buemi recovered from his earlier scare to qualify twelfth, with teammate Jaime Alguersuari in thirteenth. Paul di Resta out-qualified Adrian Sutil by placing fourteenth, followed by Rubens Barrichello and Sergio Pérez in the second Williams and Sauber respectively, with Sutil finishing seventeenth overall.

The third period began with the remaining ten drivers divided into two distinct groups: the Red Bull and McLaren drivers, who all set two flying laps, and everyone else, only going out once, many with the hope of saving an extra set of tyres for the race. Lewis Hamilton set the early benchmark with a time of exactly 1:35.000, followed by the Red Bulls and Jenson Button. Fernando Alonso was the next driver to set a time, but he was over half a second off Hamilton's pace. The top four drivers emerged again to set their final times, with each driver getting progressively faster. Jenson Button improved on his initial time, but remained fourth. Mark Webber bested him, but was still two tenths of a second off Hamilton's time. Hamilton himself improved in kind, and looked as if he had secured pole position before Sebastian Vettel crossed the line, a tenth of a second faster than Hamilton. With Vettel first and Hamilton second, followed by Webber, Button and Alonso, the top five drivers lined up in the same order as they did in Melbourne. Nick Heidfeld qualified in sixth place for Renault, followed by Massa in the second Ferrari and teammate Petrov in the second Renault in eighth. Nico Rosberg and Kamui Kobayashi completed the top ten.

Race
In what would be a dominant race for the 2010 World Champion, Vettel made a clean break from the lights and quickly began developing a strong lead from the rest of the pack. The other big winner was Nick Heidfeld, who was able to move from sixth to second at the start. By lap 9 Vettel had built a 5.2 second lead over his fellow German, and was able to comfortably bring his car home in first in spite of KERS problems that plagued the second half of his race. while Pastor Maldonado retired with a misfire. Barrichello was the next retirement with a gearbox problem, which they later traced to the hydraulics. On lap 24, the Sauber of Sergio Pérez was struck by a piece of debris, possibly from an unidentified car. The debris damaged the front wing and floor of the Sauber before passing through both the chassis and the protective Zylon panel, and hitting the ECU. The ECU was rendered inactive, stopping the car. The debris then passed out of the car by smashing through the sidepod. Jarno Trulli slid across the gravel before retiring with a clutch failure on lap 31.

The Hispanias of Karthikeyan and Liuzzi were withdrawn by the team for "safety reasons". Karthikeyan experienced an abnormal spike in water temperature on lap 15, whilst Liuzzi's car was subject to vibrations from the rear wing. Although neither fault was terminal, the team elected to retire the cars rather than risk further damage.

Behind Vettel, the McLarens of Lewis Hamilton and Jenson Button fought with Fernando Alonso for position, Button coming out on top and ultimately taking his first podium of the season, ahead of Nick Heidfeld who finished third, whilst both Hamilton and Alonso were penalised for their actions on track. Further back, D'Ambrosio pulled off the track with an electronics failure, and later Petrov crashed out from eighth place.

Classification

Qualifying

Race 

Notes
 – Fernando Alonso was penalised 20 seconds post-race for contact while trying to pass Lewis Hamilton.
 – Lewis Hamilton was also penalised 20 seconds post-race, for weaving while being passed by Fernando Alonso.
 – Vitaly Petrov crashed his Renault on lap 53 of the race, but was classified as he had completed 90% of the race-winner's distance.

Championship standings after the race 

Drivers' Championship standings

Constructors' Championship standings

 Note: Only the top five positions are included for both sets of standings.

References

External links

Official FIA race results

Malaysian Grand Prix
Grand Prix
Malaysian Grand Prix
Malaysian Grand Prix